The Babys is the self-titled debut album of the British rock group the Babys, released on 1 December 1976. It was later re-released as a double album with the group's second album Broken Heart.

Lead single "If You've Got the Time" charted on the Billboard Hot 100, peaking at No. 88.

Track listing 
All songs by John Waite, Wally Stocker, Michael Corby and Tony Brock; except where listed. 
 "Looking for Love" – 4:43
 "If You've Got the Time" (John Waite) – 2:38
 "I Believe in Love" – 4:17
 "Wild Man" – 3:29
 "Laura" – 5:02
 "I Love How You Love Me" (Barry Mann, Larry Kolber) – 2:21
 "Rodeo" (John Waite) – 2:58
 "Over and Over" – 4:47
 "Read My Stars" – 2:43
 "Dying Man" – 6:30

Personnel

Band 
 John Waite - bass, lead vocals (all but 8)
 Wally Stocker - guitar
 Michael Corby - keyboards
 Tony Brock - drums, lead vocals (8)
Technical
Jon Prew - photography

References 

1976 debut albums
The Babys albums
Albums produced by Bob Ezrin
Chrysalis Records albums